The 2014–15 UMass Lowell River Hawks men's basketball team represented the University of Massachusetts Lowell during the 2014–15 NCAA Division I men's basketball season. They were coached by second year head coach Pat Duquette and played most of their home games at Costello Athletic Center, with two home games at the Tsongas Center. They were a member of the America East Conference. They finished the season 12–17, 6–10 in America East play to finish in sixth place..

UMass Lowell was in the second year of a transition to Division I and thus ineligible for the postseason.

Roster

Schedule

|-
!colspan=9 style="background:#CC3333; color:#333399;"| Regular Season

References

UMass Lowell River Hawks men's basketball seasons
UMass Lowell
UMass Lowell River Hawks men's basketball
UMass Lowell River Hawks men's basketball